Franz-Josef Dickhut is a German amateur Go player.

Biography 
Franz-Josef Dickhut has won the German Go championship eleven times. He was European vice champion (in 1998) and European blitz go champion (in 1998). His best result at the World Amateur Championship was its fifth rank in 2005. He also participated twice as European representative at the LG-Cup (2005) and Fujitsu Cup (2009).

References

External links 
Franz-Josef Dickhut's homepage
Results of the German championships and list of the German representatives for the World Amateur Championships. 
Results of the World Amateur Championship 2005

Living people
German Go players
Year of birth missing (living people)